Richard Herz (July 21, 1867 – November 18, 1936) was a German chemist. He discovered the Herz reaction.

He studied chemistry at the University of Heidelberg, at the Technical College of Berlin and at the University of Berlin, and earned his PhD in 1891. From 1892 he was employed by the Leonhardt und Co. Works in Mühlheim am Main and in 1895 he joined a British firm, Levinstein, in Manchester. He was recruited by Cassella in 1899, and played a key role in the company's development of sulfur dyes. He received power of procuration in 1918 and became deputy director in 1925. He retired in 1931.

References

1867 births
1943 deaths
19th-century German chemists
Cassella people
20th-century German chemists